The white-bellied sunbird (Cinnyris talatala), also known as the white-breasted sunbird, is a species of bird in the family Nectariniidae.
It is found in Angola, Botswana, Democratic Republic of the Congo, Eswatini, Malawi, Mozambique, Namibia, South Africa, Tanzania, Zambia, and Zimbabwe.

Distribution and habitat
Occurs from Angola to southern Tanzania south to southern Africa, where it is common to locally abundant across northern Namibia, northern and south-eastern Botswana, Zimbabwe, Mozambique, Eswatini and north-eastern South Africa. It generally prefers semi-arid savanna woodland, such as Acacia, bushwillow (Combretum) and riparian thickets, Zambezi teak (Baikiaea plurijuga) and mixed miombo (Brachystegia) woodland.

Diet 
It mainly eats nectar supplemented with arthropods, often joining mixed-species foraging flocks in the day, along with other sunbirds at large sources of nectar. In the late afternoon it regularly hawks insects aerially and gleans invertebrates from foliage.

The following food items have been recorded in its diet:

* Nectar

 Leonotis (wild dagga)
 Tecoma capensis (Cape honeysuckle)
 Combretum mossambicense (Knobbly climbing bushwillow)
 Combretum paniculatum (Forest burning-bush combretum)
 Thunbergia grandiflora (Blue skyflower)
 Aloe
 A. arborescens (Krantz aloe)
 A. cameronii (Ruwari aloe)
 A. chabaudii (Chabaudi's aloe)
 Dalbergia nitidula (Purplewood flat-bean)
 Hibiscus
 Erythrina (coral-trees)
 Cordyla africana (Wild mango)
 Schotia (Boer-beans)
 Strelitzia
 Salvia
 Bauhinia
 Protea
 Kigelia africana (Sausage-tree)
 Watsonia
 Kniphofia (torch lilies)
 Agapanthus
 Grewia (raisins)
 Loranthaceae (mistletoes)
 alien plants
 Brunsfelia
 Canna
 Callistemon viminalis (Weeping bottlebrush)
 Cestrum (inkberries)
 Eucalyptus
 Jacaranda mimosifolia (Jacaranda)
 Ipomaea lobata (morning glory)
 Euphorbia pulcherrima (Poinsettias)
 Tecoma (South American species)
 Tithonia rotundifolia (Red sunflower)

* Arthropods
 insects
 aphids
 ants
 grasshoppers (Orthoptera)
 moths (Lepidoptera)
 spiders

Breeding
The nest (see image) is built solely by the female in about 5–8 days, consisting of an untidy oval-shaped structure made of dry material such as grass and leaves, bound together with spider web. The outside is decorated with bits of leaves and bark, while the interior is thickly lined with plant down, sometimes along with feathers and wool. It is typically attached to the branches or thorns of a plant, such as a queen-of-the-night cactus (Cereus jamacaru), prickly-pear cactus (Opuntia) or a tree, sometimes alongside active paper wasp (Belanogaster) nests.
Egg-laying season is from June–March, peaking from September–December.
It lays 1-3 eggs, which are incubated solely by the female for 13–14 days.
The chicks are brooded solely by the female but fed by both parents, leaving the nest after about 14–15 days, after which they continue to roost at the nest for about 4-14 more days.

Threats
Not threatened, in fact it seems to have benefited from the fragmentation and disturbance of miombo (Brachystegia) woodland in Zimbabwe.

Predators and parasites
It has been recorded as prey of the following mammals:
Felis cattus (Domestic cat)
Galerella sanguinea (Slender mongoose)

Brood parasites
It has been recorded as host of the Klaas's cuckoo.

References

 Gill, F and D Donsker (Eds). 2011. IOC World Bird Names (version 2.10). Available at http://www.worldbirdnames.org/ Accessed 16 November 2011.  Hockey PAR, Dean WRJ and Ryan PG 2005. Roberts - Birds of southern Africa, VIIth ed. The Trustees of the John Voelcker Bird Book Fund, Cape Town.

External links

 (White-bellied = ) White-breasted Sunbird - Species text in The Atlas of Southern African Birds.

white-bellied sunbird
Birds of Southern Africa
white-bellied sunbird
Taxonomy articles created by Polbot